Austin Wayne Self (born March 5, 1996) is an American professional stock car racing driver. He competes part-time in the NASCAR Craftsman Truck Series, driving the No. 22 Ford F-150 for his family team, AM Racing. He also has competed in the ARCA Menards Series, previously driving full-time in it for two years before moving up to the Truck Series, although he has continued to drive in the series part-time, most recently in 2019, where he drove the No. 32 Chevrolet for Win-Tron Racing.

Racing career

ARCA Menards Series

Self scored his first win at Winchester Speedway in June 2015, finishing second in the standings for that same year. As a career, Self totaled 45 starts for two teams.

Camping World Truck Series

In December 2015, it was announced that Self would compete for Rookie of the Year honors and run the entire schedule with AM Racing, driving the No. 22 Toyota Tundra owned by his father Tim Self. After failing to qualify for the third race of the season at Martinsville, Self took the place of Tommy Joe Martins, who damaged his truck in qualifying and was not able to race. Ironically, he recorded his highest Camping World Truck Series finish at that time, finishing 15th.

In his rookie season of 2016, Self was penalized two times in the first three races.  After the first race at Daytona, he was given a warning for an illegal triangular filler panel. After the third race at Martinsville, he was given a warning for trailing arm infractions.

After his family team merged with Win-Tron Racing, Self began driving trucks out of the Win-Tron shop in Mooresville, NC beginning with the thirteenth race of the season at Bristol.

Self started the 2017 season on a high note when he finished second at Daytona. However, AM Racing did not enter the following week's race at Atlanta as they planned to focus on building the team. In May, Self joined Niece Motorsports and the No. 45 Chevrolet at Kansas. At Pocono, Self joined Martins Motorsports and drove the No. 44 truck to a 16th-place finish. Self continued to drive primarily for Martins, returning to AM Racing for Canadian Tire Motorsport Park and Niece for Talladega Superspeedway.

On October 30, 2017, it was announced that Self joined Niece Motorsports for the entirety of the 2018 NASCAR Camping World Truck Series season.

Following the Homestead race, AM Racing and Niece Motorsports parted ways allowing AM Racing to field full-time for Self in 2019.

After running the first three races of the year and missing the next two, Self was indefinitely suspended by NASCAR on April 1, 2019, after the fifth event of the season. Self was suspended for violating the sanctioning body's substance abuse policy. After completing NASCAR's "Road to Recovery" rehab program, Self was reinstated on April 30.

Xfinity Series
In May 2017, Self joined MBM Motorsports for his Xfinity Series debut at Charlotte Motor Speedway. However, as the team withdrew at Cup, owner Carl Long took over the No. 40 ride for the race, delaying Self's debut. On August 15, 2022, it was announced that Self would drive a second entry for Jordan Anderson Racing at Watkins Glen International.

Personal life
He is a native of Austin, Texas. During the 2016 United States presidential election, Self was a supporter of Donald Trump; for the Talladega Superspeedway playoff Truck race that year, his No. 22 truck featured "Trump/Pence 2016" and "Make America Great Again" logos. The truck was not sponsored by Trump's campaign, and Self stated it was intended to encourage people to vote. After Trump's electoral victory, Self raced with an "American Victory: Make America Great Again" scheme at Homestead-Miami Speedway. Self would also endorse Trump in the 2020 United States presidential election and ran a Trump-Pence 2020 scheme for Margins PAC at the playoff race at Texas Motor Speedway. On January 31, 2016, Self was charged with simple physical assault and underage alcohol consumption for an incident in July 2015.

Motorsports career results

NASCAR
(key) (Bold – Pole position awarded by qualifying time. Italics – Pole position earned by points standings or practice time. * – Most laps led.)

Xfinity Series

Camping World Truck Series

K&N Pro Series East

K&N Pro Series West

 Season still in progress
 Ineligible for series points

ARCA Menards Series
(key) (Bold – Pole position awarded by qualifying time. Italics – Pole position earned by points standings or practice time. * – Most laps led.)

References

External links
 

Living people
1996 births
Sportspeople from Austin, Texas
Racing drivers from Austin, Texas
Racing drivers from Texas
NASCAR drivers
ARCA Menards Series drivers